Alexandros Agrotis (born 13 July 1998) is a Cypriot racing cyclist, who currently rides for UCI Continental team .

Major results

2015
 National Junior Road Championships
2nd Time trial
2nd Road race
2016
 National Junior Road Championships
1st  Time trial
1st  Road race
2017
 National Road Championships
1st  Road race
2nd Time trial
2018
 2nd Time trial, National Road Championships
 8th Road race, Mediterranean Games
 10th Overall International Tour of Rhodes
2021
 National Road Championships
2nd Time trial
2nd Road race
 10th Overall International Tour of Rhodes
2022
 National Road Championships
2nd Road race
4th Time trial

References

External links

1998 births
Living people
Cypriot male cyclists
Competitors at the 2018 Mediterranean Games
Mediterranean Games competitors for Cyprus
20th-century Cypriot people
21st-century Cypriot people